The Bayandur or Bayundur, is an Oghuz Turkic tribe. Originally one of the 7 original tribes that made up the Kimek–Kipchak confederation, they later joined the Oghuz Turks. The Bayandur originated from Central Asia.

History

The Bayandur are known from Arab and Persian sources.

The Bayandur was one of the 7 original tribes that made up the Kimek confederation, along with the Imur/Imi, Imak Tatar, Kipchak, Lanikaz and Ajlad. The Kimek tribes originated in the Central Asian steppes, and had migrated to the territory of present-day Kazakhstan. The Bayandur, as part of the Kimek, were mentioned by Gardizi.

The Bayandur left the Kimek and joined the Oghuz. After disintegrating, half of the tribe united with the Kipchaks. While part of the Oghuz, they were mentioned by Kashgari. They were described in the Russian Annals on 11th-century events while part of the Kipchaks.

Aq Qoyunlu

The Aq Qoyunlu was referred to as Bayanduriyye in Iranian and Ottoman sources. Their Sultans claimed descent from Bayindir Khan, which was a grandson of Oghuz Khagan, the legendary ancestor of Oghuz Turks.

Professor G. L. Lewis:

Uzun Hasan used to assert the claim that he was an "honorable descendant of Oghuz Khan and his grandson, Bayandur Khan". In a letter dating to the year 1470, which was sent to Şehzade Bayezid, the-then governor of Amasya, Uzun Hasan wrote that those from the Bayandur and Bayat tribes, as well as other tribes that belonged to the "Oghuz il", and formerly inhabited Mangyshlak, Khwarazm and Turkestan, came and served in his court. He also made the tamga of the Bayandur tribe the symbol of his state. For this reason, the Bayandur tamga is found in Aq Qoyunlu coins, their official documents, inscriptions and flags.

Bayundur today 

References

Sources
 
 
 
 

Bayandur tribe